The 1937 election for mayor of Los Angeles took place on April 6, 1937, with a runoff election on May 4, 1937. Incumbent Frank L. Shaw was reelected over Supervisor John Anson Ford in the runoff election.

Municipal elections in California, including Mayor of Los Angeles, are officially nonpartisan; candidates' party affiliations do not appear on the ballot.

Election 
Shaw, who was elected in 1933, was seeking a second term for Mayor. He was challenged by Supervisors John Anson Ford and Gordon L. McDonough as well as President of the Board of Public Works Carl B. Wirsching, the son of Supervisor Robert E. Wirsching who was nominated to the post by Shaw. In the primary, Shaw and Ford advanced to the general election.

In the runoff, Shaw defeated Ford, with Ford conceding defeat and thanking his supporters the day after the election.

Results

Primary election

General election

References and footnotes

External links
 Office of the City Clerk, City of Los Angeles

1937
Los Angeles
1937 California elections
1937 in Los Angeles